Pontoporeiidae is a family of amphipods, containing the following genera:
Diporeia Bousfield, 1989
Monoporeia Bousfield, 1989
Pontoporeia Krøyer, 1842

References

External links

Gammaridea
Crustacean families